The Equestrian at the 1983 Southeast Asian Games was held between 30 May to 3 June at Bukit Timah Polo Club. The South East Asian Games is held biannually and involves over 11 countries in South East Asia. The 1983 Southeast Asian Games were the 12th year of these games.

Medal summary

Men

Medal table

References

 https://eresources.nlb.gov.sg/newspapers/Digitised/Article/straitstimes19830531-1.2.123
 https://eresources.nlb.gov.sg/newspapers/Digitised/Article/straitstimes19830601-1.2.137
 https://eresources.nlb.gov.sg/newspapers/Digitised/Article/straitstimes19830606-1.2.102

1983
1983 in equestrian
1983 Southeast Asian Games events